Himatangi Beach is a small coastal community in the Manawatū-Whanganui region of New Zealand's North Island. It is located 32 kilometres west of Palmerston North in the centre of the largest sand dune geographical feature in New Zealand.

Demographics 

The population of Himatangi Beach was 510 in the 2018 New Zealand census, an increase of 81 (18.9%) since the 2013 census, and an increase of 60 (13.3%) since the 2006 census. There were 261 males and 249 females, giving a sex ratio of 1.05 males per female. Ethnicities were 453 people  (88.8%) European/Pākehā, 84 (16.5%) Māori, 6 (1.2%) Pacific peoples, and 12 (2.4%) Asian (totals add to more than 100% since people could identify with multiple ethnicities). Of the total population, 60 people  (11.8%) were under 15 years old, 66 (12.9%) were 15–29, 252 (49.4%) were 30–64, and 132 (25.9%) were over 65.

The population increases to several thousand in the summer.

See also
Himatangi

References

Manawatu District
Populated places in Manawatū-Whanganui